Hitstory is a 2005 compilation album by Elvis Presley.

Hitstory may also refer to:

 HITstory, a 2012 mixtape by Hit-Boy
 Hitstory, a 2015 album by Gianna Nannini

See also
 History (disambiguation)